Caventou is a tiny lunar impact crater located in the western part of the Mare Imbrium. It is a circular, cup-shaped formation surrounded by the lunar mare. It was named after French chemist Joseph B. Caventou in 1976. Prior to that, it had the designation La Hire D, being associated with the mountain Mons La Hire to the southeast.

References

External links

 LTO-40A1 Caventou — L&PI topographic map - partial map undisplayed

Impact craters on the Moon
Mare Imbrium